Ney Yépez Cortés (born 1968, in Quito) is an Ecuadorian writer, journalist, poet, songwriter, screenwriter, lecturer, and teacher of Tai Chi, Reiki and Qi Gong.

The Encyclopedia of Science Fiction called Yépez Cortés "one of the most cited authors of the new generation of Ecuadorian science fiction writers". His first book of short stories Mundos abiertos was a collection of stories written in a 15-year period. One of the stories, "Segundo tiempo", was written when he was 16 years old. He published surrealist poems in the magazine Ixo facto. The success of his first book of short stories led to a second collection titled Historias ocultas which he wrote in a 2-month period.

In 2006 Yépez Cortés published his first novel Las sombras de la Casa Mitre, and its sequel El árbol de las brujas was published in 2009. These two books are part of a trilogy whose third book has not yet been published (as of 2013). In 2013 he published the book "La vuelta del músico", of short stories.

Works
Fiction
 Mundos abiertos (2001) short stories
 Historias ocultas (2003)short stories
 Las sombras de la casa Mitre (2006) novel
 El árbol de las brujas (2009) novel
 Crónicas Intraterrestres en la cueva de Los Tayos (2011) novel
 La vuelta del músico (2013) short stories

He has also written manuals on Eastern philosophy and practices:
 Tui Na Shou Fa - la técnica de manos
 Chi Kung - el arte de la energía vital
 Meditación y Visualización
 El poder de los Mudras
 Iniciación Reiki Do
 Feng Shui de la escuela Bagua
 Reiki Qigong - tratamientos avanzados

As a musician-composer, he has performed compositions in different musical genres and has edited the following works:
 "Dama Tapada" (hard rock - progressive), 2016
 "Past and Present" (acoustic rock - folk), 2014
 "Biography" (rock - pop - progressive), 2011
 "Bamboo Spirit" (new age), 2008
 "Guided Meditations" (new age), 2006
 "Mantra Live" (alternative rock), 2001
 "Ney and Disconnected" (acoustic rock - folk), 1997
 "Intrigo" (acoustic rock - folk), 1993
 "Duo Vadis" (acoustic rock - folk), 1987

References

1968 births
Living people
Ecuadorian journalists
Male journalists
People from Quito
Ecuadorian poets
Ecuadorian songwriters
Male songwriters
Ecuadorian screenwriters
Ecuadorian male short story writers
Ecuadorian short story writers
Ecuadorian male writers
Ecuadorian science fiction writers
21st-century novelists
21st-century short story writers
21st-century male writers
Date of birth missing (living people)
21st-century screenwriters